Podporezen is a small settlement in the Municipality of Železniki in the Upper Carniola region of Slovenia.

References

External links
Podporezen at Geopedia

Populated places in the Municipality of Železniki